Dominick "Nicky" Gilbert Hernandez (born September 21, 1998) is an American soccer player.

Playing career

Youth, college and amateur
Hernandez was part of the USSDA academy side Dallas Texans until 2017, when he went to play college soccer at Southern Methodist University. Hernandez played three seasons with the Mustangs between 2017 and 2019, making 48 appearances, scoring 8 goals and tallying 9 assists. Hernandez was named AAC All-Tournament Team in 2019 and All-SMU Tournament Team in 2018.

While at college, Hernandez played with USL PDL side Texas United during their 2018 season, scoring 2 goals and tallying 3 assists in 9 regular season appearances. During his 2019 season, Hernandez played with NPSL side Denton Diablos FC.

Hernandez played in the United Premier Soccer League for FC Harrington during the Spring 2020 season.

North Texas SC
On September 12, 2020, Hernandez left college early to sign a professional contract with North Texas SC, the USL League One affiliate of MLS side FC Dallas. He made his debut the same day, starting in a 2–0 win over FC Tucson.

On January 21, 2021, FC Dallas selected Hernandez 15th overall in the 2021 MLS SuperDraft.

FC Dallas
On March 23, 2021, Hernandez officially signed for MLS side FC Dallas. Following the 2022 season, his contract option was declined by Dallas.

References 

1998 births
American soccer players
Association football midfielders
FC Dallas draft picks
FC Dallas players
Living people
National Premier Soccer League players
North Texas SC players
People from Duncanville, Texas
San Antonio FC players
SMU Mustangs men's soccer players
Soccer players from Texas
USL Championship players
USL League One players
USL League Two players
United Premier Soccer League players